The Nigerian Premier Basketball League, often abbreviated to the NPL, is the pre-eminent men's professional basketball league in Nigeria. The league consists of sixteen teams who are categorized into two conferences based on the geographical location. These conferences are Savannah and the Atlantic. The league was sponsored by the DSTV until 2017, who had both title and TV rights through the contract agreement. The league was then referred to as the DSTV Premier Basketball League.

Format

The league usually spans from March till mid year. Each team plays a total of 14 games in a regular season after which the top four teams qualify for the Final Eight Playoffs which usually takes place at the National Stadium Surulere Lagos. The team at the bottom of the table in each conference is relegated from the league. Towards the end of the year, the Division 1 Championship is held to determine who will be promoted to the DSTV League for the new season. In the 2014 season, Royal Hoopers of Rivers State and Niger Potter of Nigers State were both relegated from the Atlantic and Savannah Conference respectively. Accordingly, the Delta Force and FCT Rocks were promoted to the league having won the Division 1 Championship in November 2014.

Amendments were made to the schedule of events this season. At the end of the season, the top six teams from each conference will play conference playoffs to determine the winner of each conference before the top four of each conference will play the Final Eight Playoffs to determine the league winner. This is to increase the number of games played by each team in a particular season.

History 
In 2017, Nigeria Basketball Federation reached an agreement with Kwese Sports for the title rights of the league. The deal runs till 2021,
and it was worth $12 million.

Since 2021, the champions of the Premier League qualify directly for the regular season of the Basketball Africa League (BAL), Africa's new first-tier created as a joint venture by the NBA and FIBA.

In the 2021 season, the league was organised by the Nigerian Ministry of Youth and Sports , after they earlier dissolved the caretaker committee of the NBBF. FIBA rules prohibit governments from intervening in federations, which is why the championship was ruled illegitimate. As a result, the 2021 champions Rivers Hoopers were excluded from participation in the 2022 BAL season.

List of winners

FIBA did not recognise Rivers Hoopers as champions, which caused them to lose their place in the 2022 BAL season.

Titles by club

Clubs

Savannah Conference

Atlantic Conference

In the Basketball Africa League 
The champions of the Nigerian Premier League qualify directly to the Basketball Africa League (BAL)

References

External links
Africabasket.com League Page
FIBA.com League Page
BballNaija

Basketball competitions in Nigeria
Basketball leagues in Africa
Basketball